Igralishte is a village in Strumyani Municipality, in Blagoevgrad Province, in southwestern Bulgaria.

Igralishte Peak in Antarctica is named after the village.

References

Villages in Blagoevgrad Province